Lázaro Cárdenas is one of the eleven municipalities that make up the Mexican state of Quintana Roo. Its municipal seat is the town of Kantunilkín, which was founded on 10 October 1859. Its borders are, to the west, the municipalities of Tizimín and Chemax in the state of Yucatán, to the east the municipalities of Isla Mujeres and Benito Juárez, and to the south Solidaridad.

It is named after Lázaro Cárdenas del Río who was President of Mexico from 1934 to 1940.

Geography

Like most of the Yucatan Peninsula, Lázaro Cárdenas is entirely flat with a gentle slope towards the sea, so from west to east.

Like the rest of the peninsula's surface, the land has a limestone base that does not allow the formation of surface water flows such as rivers and streams, the water instead forms flows in underground rivers that sometimes rise to the surface in the cenotes. Lakes and cenotes are the major bodies of water in the municipality.

Communities

The municipality is made up of 82 populated localities (localidades), as well as 81 unpopulated localities. The largest localities (cities, towns, and villages) are:

Demographics

References

Municipalities of Quintana Roo